In 2016, New York became the 50th U.S. state to legalize and regulate mixed martial arts (MMA), after the sport had been banned in the state in 1997. The New York State Athletic Commission (NYSAC) oversees mixed martial arts contests in the state.

History

Pre-ban
UFC 7 was held on September 8, 1995, at the Memorial Auditorium in Buffalo, New York.

Ban (1997–2016)
In February 1997, Governor George Pataki signed into law a bill that banned MMA in the state. This resulted in the UFC 12 event being moved from its originally scheduled location of Buffalo, New York, to Dothan, Alabama.

Post-ban (2016–present)
On March 22, 2016, New York became the 50th U.S. state to legalize and regulate the sport when the New York State Assembly approved Bill No. A02604. From 2010, the New York State Senate had passed a legalization bill, but it had never passed the State Assembly, largely due to the opposition of Assembly Speaker Sheldon Silver.

UFC 205: Alvarez vs. McGregor, held at Madison Square Garden on November 12, 2016, was the UFC's first event in New York following the lifting of the MMA ban. UFC 210: Cormier vs. Johnson 2, held on April 8, 2017, at the KeyBank Center, was UFC's first appearance in Buffalo since UFC 7 in 1995.

U.S. President Donald Trump attended UFC 244: Masvidal vs. Diaz, held on November 2, 2019, in Madison Square Garden.

In June 2019, the Times Union reported that MMA expansion in New York was being hindered by the lack of regulations permitting pro–am events. Small- and medium-sized promoters are restricted to organizing amateur-only events because they are unable to cover the high insurance costs for professional events.

See also
 Mixed martial arts in the United States

References

Mixed martial arts in New York (state)